Leipalingis Manor was a residential manor in Leipalingis, Lithuania. Only oficina remained until nowadays.

References

External links
Photo from 2011

Manor houses in Lithuania
Classicism architecture in Lithuania